"" (English: In the heat of summer I eat) is a canon for three voices in G major, K. 234/382e. The music was long thought to have been composed by Wolfgang Amadeus Mozart during 1782 in Vienna, but now thought to be the work of Wenzel Trnka. The lyrics appear to stem from Mozart.

Authenticity
In 1988, Wolfgang Plath presented evidence that the composer of this piece, as well as K. 233/382d, was in fact Wenzel Trnka (1739–1791). That Mozart might not be the author of K. 229, K. 230, K. 231, K. 233, K. 234 was already mentioned in the Bärenreiter Neue Mozart-Ausgabe (NMA) in 1974. Mozart's widow Constanze Mozart submitted the modified canon to publisher Breitkopf & Härtel.

Lyrics
The rediscovered, probably original text reads:
{|
|
|style="padding-left:2em;"|In the heat of summer I like to eat
roots and spices, also butter and radish;
they expel a lovely wind and cool me.
I take lemonade, almond milk,
and at time beer from Horn;
that only in a hot summer.
I for me an ice-cooled glass of wine,
Also my glass of sorbet.
|}

Alternative lyrics
Shown in Bärenreiter's Neue Mozart-Ausgabe is the text as changed for the 1804 edition of the canons in Œuvres Complettes by Breitkopf & Härtel.
{|
|
|style="padding-left:2em;"|Eating, drinking, that sustains the body;
'tis my dearest pastime,
eating and drinking!
If food and drink refresh me no more,
the adieu, then world, good night!
Such a roast, a pie, alas!
when they greet my tongue,
then, then my day is made!
Alas! and when in a dear glass
worries and grief are drowned,
then to all the world: good night!
|}

See also
The Mozart misattribution, for more on the canon's misattribution to Mozart

Notes

References

Canons by Wolfgang Amadeus Mozart
1782 compositions
Compositions in G major